Kathryn Heyman is an Australian writer of novels and plays. She is the director of the Australian Writers Mentoring Program and Fiction Program Director of Faber Writing Academy.

Career 
Born in New South Wales, Australia, she was brought up in Lake Macquarie with her four siblings.

As a young adult Heyman spent many years in the United Kingdom, where she studied under the Caribbean poet E.A. Markham, and where she was first published.

Heyman is the author of six novels: The Breaking (1997), Keep Your Hands on the Wheel (1999), The Accomplice (2003)  Captain Starlight's Apprentice (2006) Floodline (2013) and Storm and Grace (2017) She is also a playwright for theatre and radio and has held a number of creative writing fellowships in the UK and Australia. Her short stories have appeared in a number of collections and also on radio.

Heyman's first novel, The Breaking, was longlisted for the Orange Prize, and shortlisted for the Scottish Writer of the Year Award. Her third, The Accomplice, won an Arts Council England Writer's Award and was shortlisted for the Western Australian Premier's Book Awards. The Accomplice is a fictional account of the wreck of the Dutch flagship the Batavia off the Australian coast in the 17th century. As a meditation on complicity with evil it has been compared with the work of Joseph Conrad and William Golding.

Her fourth novel, Captain Starlight's Apprentice, features a woman bushranger, the birth (and near death) of the Australian film industry, and a British migrant to Australia who undergoes electroconvulsive therapy. In 2007 the novel was shortlisted for the Nita Kibble Literary Award.

Floodline, published 2013, is set during the aftermath of a great flood, and has been compared with the writing of Cormac McCarthy. Heyman's writing has also been compared with that of Angela Carter, David Malouf, Peter Carey and Kate Grenville.

Heyman's sixth novel Storm  & Grace, a psychological thriller about freediving, deals with violence against women and was published by Allen & Unwin in February 2017.

Heyman's work has appeared on BBC Radio 4, and a five-part dramatic adaptation of Captain Starlight's Apprentice was broadcast on Woman's Hour in April 2007. In 2013 she delivered the NSW Premier's Literary Awards keynote address.

Books 
The Breaking. Phoenix House (1997); Allen & Unwin (2012) 
Keep Your Hands on the Wheel. Phoenix House (1999); Allen & Unwin (2012) 
The Accomplice. Hodder Headline (2003); Allen & Unwin (2012) 
Captain Starlight's Apprentice. Hodder Headline (2006); Allen & Unwin (2012) 
Floodline. Allen & Unwin (2013) 
Storm & Grace. Allen & Unwin (2017) 
Fury. Allen & Unwin (2021)

Plays 
The Princess Who Couldn't Fly (and a Word or Two About the Crippled King) (1990)
Unreal (1991)
Sex, Lies and Model Aeroplanes (1991) with David Lennie and Paul Tolton
Exodus (1993) with David Purveur
Dancing on the Word (1993) 
That's The Way to Do It (1994) with Jo Enright

Works for BBC Radio 
Far Country (2002), starring Kerry Fox
Keep Your Hands on the Wheel (2003), starring Kerry Fox
Moonlight's Boy (2005)
Closing Time (2005), (BBC short)
Captain Starlight's Apprentice (2007)

Awards 
Adelaide Festival Awards for Literature Nonfiction Award shortlist, 2022 (Fury)
Australia Council Established Writers New Work Grant 2006 – 2008 
Kibble Prize shortlist, (Captain Starlight's Apprentice) 
Arts Council of England Writer's Award, (The Accomplice) 
Western Australian Premier's Book Awards shortlist, (The Accomplice) 
Wingate Scholarship, (The Accomplice) 
Southern Arts Writers Award (Keep Your Hands on the Wheel) 
Orange Prize longlist, (The Breaking) 
Stakis Prize for Scottish Writer of the Year shortlist, (The Breaking) 
Hallam Poetry Prize, 1996

References

External links 

Australian Writers Mentoring Program
Author page at Allen & Unwin, Australian publisher.
Kathryn Heyman's Occasional Blog
Short summary of Floodline by Adelaide Writers' Week director Laura Kroetsch

1965 births
Living people
20th-century Australian novelists
21st-century Australian novelists
Writers from New South Wales
Australian women novelists
20th-century Australian women writers
21st-century Australian women writers